In mathematics, a comma category (a special case being a slice category) is a construction in category theory. It provides another way of looking at morphisms: instead of simply relating objects of a category to one another, morphisms become objects in their own right. This notion was introduced in 1963 by F. W. Lawvere (Lawvere, 1963 p. 36), although the technique did not become generally known until many years later. Several mathematical concepts can be treated as comma categories. Comma categories also guarantee the existence of some limits and colimits. The name comes from the notation originally used by Lawvere, which involved the comma punctuation mark. The name persists even though standard notation has changed, since the use of a comma as an operator is potentially confusing, and even Lawvere dislikes the uninformative term "comma category" (Lawvere, 1963 p. 13).

Definition
The most general comma category construction involves two functors with the same codomain.  Often one of these will have domain 1 (the one-object one-morphism category). Some accounts of category theory consider only these special cases, but the term comma category is actually much more general.

General form

We can form the comma category  as follows:

Morphisms are composed by taking  to be , whenever the latter expression is defined.

Slice category

The objects  can be simplified to pairs , where .

Coslice category

The dual concept to a slice category is a coslice category.

Arrow category

In this case, the comma category is the arrow category .

Other variations
In the case of the slice or coslice category, the identity functor may be replaced with some other functor; this yields a family of categories particularly useful in the study of adjoint functors.

Properties
For each comma category there are forgetful functors from it.
 Domain functor, which maps:
 objects: ;
 morphisms: ;
 Codomain functor, which maps:
 objects: ;
 morphisms: .
 Arrow functor, which maps:
 objects: ;
 morphisms: ;

Examples of use

Some notable categories
Several interesting categories have a natural definition in terms of comma categories.
Each object of this category is a set, together with a function selecting some element of the set: the "basepoint". Morphisms are functions on sets which map basepoints to basepoints. In a similar fashion one can form the category of pointed spaces .
Morphisms are then maps  that make the diagram commute.
That is,  picks out certain edges from the set  of possible edges. A morphism in this category is made up of two functions, one on the indexing set and one on the node set. They must "agree" according to the general definition above, meaning that  must satisfy . In other words, the edge corresponding to a certain element of the indexing set, when translated, must be the same as the edge for the translated index.
 Many "augmentation" or "labelling" operations can be expressed in terms of comma categories. This form of comma category is often called objects -over  - closely related to the "objects over " discussed above. The nodes of the graph could be labelled in essentially the same way.
 A category is said to be locally cartesian closed if every slice of it is cartesian closed (see above for the notion of slice). Locally cartesian closed categories are the classifying categories of dependent type theories.

Limits and universal morphisms

Limits and colimits in comma categories may be "inherited".

For example, note that in the above construction of the category of graphs as a comma category, the category of sets is complete and cocomplete, and the identity functor is continuous and cocontinuous.  Thus, the category of graphs is complete and cocomplete.

The notion of a universal morphism to a particular colimit, or from a limit, can be expressed in terms of a comma category. Essentially, we create a category whose objects are cones, and where the limiting cone is a terminal object; then, each universal morphism for the limit is just the morphism to the terminal object. This works in the dual case, with a category of cocones having an initial object. In other words, it is an object in the comma category  having a morphism to any other object in that category; it is initial.

Adjunctions
This allows adjunctions to be described without involving sets, and was in fact the original motivation for introducing comma categories.

Natural transformations
The difference between the two notions is that a natural transformation is a particular collection of morphisms of type of the form , while objects of the comma category contains all morphisms of type of such form. A functor to the comma category selects that particular collection of morphisms. This is described succinctly by an observation by S.A. Huq

References

Lawvere, W (1963). "Functorial semantics of algebraic theories" and "Some algebraic problems in the context of functorial semantics of algebraic theories".  http://www.tac.mta.ca/tac/reprints/articles/5/tr5.pdf

External links

 J. Adamek, H. Herrlich, G. Stecker, Abstract and Concrete Categories-The Joy of Cats
 WildCats is a category theory package for Mathematica. Manipulation and visualization of objects, morphisms, categories, functors, natural transformations, universal properties.
Interactive Web page which generates examples of categorical constructions in the category of finite sets.

Categories in category theory